Kuwanoin-ike is an earthfill dam located in Toyama prefecture in Japan. The dam is used for irrigation. The catchment area of the dam is 2.9 km2. The dam impounds about 11  ha of land when full and can store 794 thousand cubic meters of water. The construction of the dam was completed in 1953.

References

Dams in Toyama Prefecture
1953 establishments in Japan